Blastobasis phycidella is a moth in the  family Blastobasidae. It is found in most of Europe (except Fennoscandia, Latvia, Estonia, Ireland and Iceland).

The wingspan is 17–19 mm. There is probably one generation per year with adults on wing from the end of June to the beginning of early August.

The larvae feed on decomposing wood of oak (Quercus species), fallen pine needles and dried fungus.

References

External links
 Blastobasis phycidella at UKmoths 

Blastobasis
Moths described in 1839
Moths of Europe
Moths of Asia
Taxa named by Philipp Christoph Zeller